The Nature Forever Society (NFS) is a non-profit, non-governmental organization working for the conservation of house sparrows and other common flora and fauna since 2006. Started by Mohammed Dilawar (founder and president), Nature Forever Society was registered in 2008. The mission of the Nature Forever Society is to involve citizens in the conservation movement in India. To achieve this Nature Forever Society has been working by launching initiatives that are simple and have far-reaching conservation value. Dilawar said:

"For me, if we can't save a sparrow which is found around us then it is too ambitious to save a tiger. So first we have to save the sparrows and only then can we dream of saving the tiger."

Since it started Nature Forever Society has spearheaded programs and projects that are making a visible difference to sparrow populations in cities. Some of the initiatives started by Nature Forever Society are CBMI, World Sparrow Day, Project SOS, NFS Sparrow Awards, and Adopt a Feeder and Nest program, among others.

Common Bird Monitoring of India (CBMI)

The Common Bird Monitoring of India program is a pioneer project and the first of its kind in India. Launched in Mumbai, India. on the occasion of World Sparrow Day on 20 March 2012, its objective is to monitor common birds found in India.

The program is aimed at monitoring, through detailed mapping, the 18 common bird species found across the country such as the house sparrows, house crow, rock pigeon , and  rose-ringed parakeet, as well as the lesser known ashy Prinia and hoopoe.

It is a unique project because it is by the people, for the people, and of the people.  In addition to India, the project also aims to help map the common bird species in the entire Indian subcontinent, including Pakistan, Bangladesh , and Sri Lanka.

World Sparrow Day (WSD)

World Sparrow Day is an initiative celebrated on March 20th every year as World Sparrow Day. World Sparrow Day was first celebrated in 2009. In less than three years, WSD has become very popular and is celebrated in more than 50 countries around the world. It is also gaining popularity in Europe and parts of South Asia.

The World Sparrow Day website has a large collection of photos and information about the twenty-two species of sparrows found around the world.

House sparrow is now the state bird of Delhi

The Nature Forever Society proposed to the Delhi government that the house sparrow be declared the state bird of Delhi. At a campaign "Rise for the Sparrows" aimed at conserving the species, Delhi Chief Minister Sheila Dikshit declared the sparrow the “state bird” of Delhi on August 14, 2012.

Rise for the Sparrow

Rise for the Sparrow aims to inspire, empower and involve the citizens, schools, educational organizations, government agencies, NGOs , and practically anyone interested in contributing to the conservation of sparrows and other common birds. It aims to achieve this by providing simple choices which can be undertaken by citizens and organisations from diverse backgrounds.

Adopt Nest Box and Bird Feeders

To involve citizens in the conservation movement and get them emotionally attached to the cause of conservation, the Nature Forever Society initiated a program where people could adopt a nest box and/or bird feeder. By doing this they would not only provide a habitat for the birds to nest in their homes but also get attached to the cause.

So far a large number of nest boxes and bird feeders have been adopted across the country and taking inspiration from NFS, numerous organisations and individuals have initiated this across the country.

Project Save Our Sparrow (SOS)

Nature Forever Society, in association with the Burhani Foundation, implemented project SOS where 52,000 bird feeders were distributed across the world to save sparrows and other common birds. The project was recognised by the Guinness Book of World records for the highest distribution of bird feeders in the world. “Ours is a fight to conserve not just the diminishing sparrow count around the world, but to save all the common birds and biodiversity found in our immediate environment, which are often overlooked and abused by being too commonplace,” said Dilawar.

Sparrow Awards

Nature Forever Society launched its first Sparrow Awards on 20 March 2011 to honor unsung environmental heroes who have been silently making a difference. From the numerous nominations received from across the country, four winners (three individuals and one organisation) are selected for the NFS Sparrow Awards from diverse fields and backgrounds.

NFS had noticed that in the conservation field, the best-known conservationists consistently receive accolades for their good work, however, many others make consistent efforts to save the environment but are not applauded. The sentiment behind launching the Sparrow Awards was to honor such people and applaud their silent efforts.

NFS aspires to make the Sparrow Awards one of the most prestigious awards one could hold, very tough to attain and inspirational to retain.

2011 winners
Bhavin Shah
Narendra Singh Chaudhary
L Shyamal
The Sparrow Company

2012 winners
Dilsher Khan of Satna, Madhya Pradesh, 43 years old, a welder
Ramita Kondepudi of Bangalore, Karnataka, 15 years old, a 10th-grade student
The Green Umbrella Team, Vikram Yende, Kapil Jadhav, Mahendra Khawnekar and Vishal Revankar of Kalwa, Thane, Maharashtra
Shri Mahatma Gandhi Ashramsala, a school in Po-Mangvana, Kutch, Gujarat

2013 winners
Saleem Hameedi, wildlife photographer, illustrator
Aabid Surti, litterateur  and head of the NGO Drop Dead
Jayant Govind Dukhande, Mumbai Police

2014 winners 
Jag Mohan Garg
N. Shehzad & M. Saud
Jal Grahan Kameti, Piplantri

2015 winners 
Arif Siddique
BBMP Forest Cell Volunteers
Rushikulya Sea Turtle Protection Committee

2016 winners 
Musical Nature
Roseland Residency Society Pune 
Abdul Kareem - The Forest Man

2017 winners 
Afroz Shah
Ashwin Baindur
Green Societies

Biodiversity Photo Competition

Nature photography has for long been associated with glamorous species, costly cameras, and traveling to exotic locations. Things have not changed much even today, people who have costly telescope lenses and DSLRs travel to far-flung areas to get images, from tigers to great Indian bustards.

This has resulted in an imbalance where there are mountains of high-quality images of threatened and glamorous species while images of common species are a rarity.

Through the Biodiversity Photo Competition, the NFS wanted to change this attitude in the age of digital and mobile phone cameras and wanted common people to get involved in photo documenting the common flora and fauna of the country. This also helps to increase awareness regarding the conservation of common flora and fauna which are found in and around humans and urban flora and fauna.

2013 winners
S. Thangaraj
Michael Nongthombam
Lakshmi Annamalai

Other initiatives

The Help Birds in Summer Campaign is an initiative where people forward an SMS and posters for display that urge people to provide water for birds during summer. This campaign has been immensely successful and is initiated every year at the onset of the summer.

Society has also been working for the past few years to get the catapult banned in the country. The Ban the Catapult campaign hopes to curb the use of the catapult and include the catapult as a weapon in the Wildlife act of India. They have been regularly creating awareness regarding this through various media.

To disseminate information about the conservation of house sparrows the Nature Forever Society has created the websites below. The websites give detailed information about the decline of house sparrows, monitoring, and how citizens can play a vital role in their conservation.

References

External links

www.cbmi.in
www.worldsparrowday.org

2006 establishments in India
Nature conservation organisations based in India